Logansport is a city in and the county seat of Cass County, Indiana, United States. The population was 18,366 at the 2020 census. Logansport is located in northern Indiana at the junction of the Wabash and Eel rivers, northwest of Kokomo.

History
Logansport was settled circa 1826 and named after a Shawnee warrior named James Logan, better known as "Captain Logan," who served as a scout for U.S. forces in the surrounding area during the War of 1812.

Logansport is home to a refurbished Dentzel Carousel. Of many carousels built by the Dentzel Carousel Company, the refurbished Dentzel Carousel is "one of the three earliest Dentzel menagerie carousels that are virtually intact". The carousel resides in Riverside Park on the banks of the Eel River. Riders may attempt to grab a brass ring while riding, this carousel game serves as the current basis for the local economic-development slogan “Logansport – Cass County:  Grab the brass ring”. The Carousel is on the National Register of Historic Places and is a national landmark.  Also listed on the National Register of Historic Places are the Bankers Row Historic District, Courthouse Historic District, Ferguson House, Jerolaman-Long House, John Keip House, Kendrick-Baldwin House, Willard B. Place House, Point Historic District, Pollard-Nelson House, and Henry Tousley House.

Logansport Community High School is the home of the oldest known high school mascot in Indiana, the animated Felix the Cat. Three competing legends claim to tell its origin story, however all accounts agree that Felix was brought into the high school's tradition at some point between 1925 and 1926.

Logansport also has a diverse transportation history. The Wabash and Erie Canal reached Logansport in 1837, contributing the “port” to Logansport's name, as in “Logan's port”. The Historic Michigan Road runs through Logansport. Michigan Road was one of the first roads in Indiana. It runs from Madison, Indiana (South), to Michigan City, Indiana (North). There are many different names for the road, including Michigan Road, State Road 29, and US 421. Also several different passenger and freight train routes also served Logansport. 

The Brotherhood of Railroad Trainmen and Ladies Auxiliary held its 1935 convention in Logansport. In addition to the Wabash, whose Wabash Cannon Ball stopped in the town, Pennsylvania Railroad trains such as the Union, on the Chicago-Cincinnati and the Chicago-Louisville routes, trains to Pittsburgh via Columbus, along with the Southland to Florida, made stops in Logansport. Logansport still has two active railroads and a switch yard, as well as a small refurbished depot downtown, although the much larger Pan Handle Depot was demolished in 1962.

Early in the 20th century, Logansport was home to the pioneering brass era automobile company Rutenber that had been based previously in Chicago and that renamed itself the Western Motor Company when it moved to Logansport. Edwin Rutenber started the Western Motor Company after inventing the first four-cylinder automobile engine. Rutenber was a prolific inventor who held dozens of patents ranging from the first automobile four-cylinder engine and distributor cap system to many electric home appliances, whose modern versions are still in use today.

Renewal
In 2009, Logansport was designated a Preserve America Community. This designation was bestowed upon Logansport by former First Lady Laura Bush, as one of her last unofficial duties before leaving the White House. Preserve America Executive Order
Signed by President George W. Bush on March 3, 2003, Executive Order 13287, "Preserve America," complements the Preserve America initiative.

Preserve America Community designations are awarded to communities that:
 protect and celebrate their heritage;
 use their historic assets for economic development and community revitalization; and
 encourage people to experience and appreciate local historic resources through education and heritage tourism program.

Logan's Landing is a nonprofit economic development organization that focuses on the downtown of Logansport between the junction of the southernmost terminus of the Eel River as it joins the Wabash River.  The City of Logansport Economic Development Organization is another nonprofit economic development organization that focuses on development outside of the downtown area, such as industrial parks, available commercial buildings other than downtown buildings, and other available undeveloped land.  The Logansport – Cass County Chamber of Commerce is a forum for local business leadership, as an interface between businesses and the local community.

Community events
Logansport is home to the McHale Performing Arts Center, adjacent to Logansport High School. As a fine facility and technically one of the best equipped auditoriums in the state, McHale PAC plays host to the annual Winter Fantasy Production, as sponsored by a union of the organizations in the Logansport High School Performing Arts Department. These musicals are held every year during the last weekend prior to the Thanksgiving holiday. The facility also holds the rest of the department's annual events, including the LHS Tony Awards, SNL, the All School Production and various music department concerts. Out-of-town live soloists and troupes also put on several live-performance shows per year at McHale.  As a modern facility for the performing arts, Loganport's McHale is comparable to similar-sized venues in similar-sized towns and cities throughout the Great Lakes region, such as the Honeywell Center in Wabash, Indiana, The Tibbits Opera House in Coldwater, Michigan, The Croswell Opera House in Adrian, Michigan, The Opera House of Sandwich in Sandwich, Illinois, The Round Barn Theatre in Nappanee, Indiana, and the Williams Theatre on the campus of Purdue-Fort Wayne in Fort Wayne. The loaning of the facility's equipment is in high demand by many amateur as well as professional venues throughout the state.

Logansport also has the oldest art organization in Indiana. The Logansport Art Association (LAA) was founded in February 1911. What began as a Neighborhood Art Club in 1894, is now an art center that offers art classes, show opportunities, art supplies, and special events. The LAA holds annual fine art competitions and shows that draw local and statewide artists. This includes the Black & White Show in February, Youth Art Shows in March and April, Fine Arts Show in May and June, a Photography Competition in October, and their Members Invitational in November.

Logansport hosts an annual arts festival Art on the Avenue, every September, which is the largest art festival in the region. Many of the area's festivals and events are held at Little Turtle Waterway. Little Turtle Waterway is an architect-designed public space and trail system along the Wabash River in downtown Logansport. Logansport also hosts the annual Med Flory Jazz Festival every spring in downtown Logansport. Med Flory is a well-known jazz musician and actor from Logansport. Until recent years, to honor its railroad history, Logansport held its annual Iron Horse Festival. When many of the trains were taken out of the area, the festival had turned into a Heritage Festival, but then eventually canceled.  Other annual festivals in Logansport include:

 Throughout the summer month, every Sunday evening enjoy live music at Little Turtle Waterway
 The Med Flory Jazz and Blues Fest, held in July presented by the Cass County Arts Alliance
 the Taste Of Cass County held every August in downtown Logansport presented by Logan's Landing
 Art of and Avenue is held the 2nd Saturday of September presented by the Cass County Arts Alliance
 Downtown Spooktacular held in October for the Halloween Festivities
 Light up Logansport & Downtown Christmas Open House, held the Friday evening after Thanksgiving to usher in the Christmas season

Education
Logansport Community School Corporation serves the city of Logansport and surrounding area. With an enrollment of over 4,500, the corporation utilizes 8 different buildings:
 Columbia Elementary School
 Franklin Elementary School
 Fairview Elementary School
 Landis Elementary School
 Columbia 6th grade Academy
 Logansport Junior High School
 Logansport High School
 Century Career Center

Despite also having Felix the Cat as their official mascot (which is considered as Indiana's oldest recognized mascot) and de facto logo throughout academic and athletic programs, the moniker of Logansport High School's athletic teams is the Loganberries, which is a pun on the city's name vis a vis the loganberry hybrid of a blackberry and a red raspberry.  The basketball gymnasium at Logansport High School furthers the pun by being officially named the Berry Bowl.  The Berry Bowl is connected through the school to the McHale Performing Arts Center which overlooks the adjacent courtyard and entrance hall.

The town is home to two institutions of higher learning, a regional campus of Indiana's Ivy Tech community college that offers associates, and certification, as well as a satellite campus of Trine University offering associates, bachelors, and master's degrees.

Logansport has a public library, a branch of the Cass County Public Library.

Geography
Logansport is located at  (40.753478, -86.360485).

The farmland to the south is generally flat, but there are some shallow hills to the north and east of Logansport that form a ridge through northern Cass and Miami counties.  Similar nearby ridges—such as surrounding the nearby towns of Fowler and Goodland—have been found suitable for multi-hundred-megawatt wind farms, such as the nearby Fowler Ridge I & II Wind Farms and Goodland I Wind Farm.

Demographics

2010 census
As of the census of 2010, there were 18,396 people, 6,877 households, and 4,272 families residing in the city. The racial makeup of the city was 80.7% White, 2.3% African American, 0.8% Native American, 1.7% Asian, 0.1% Pacific Islander, 12.3% from other races, and 2.2% from two or more races. Hispanic or Latino of any race were 21.6% of the population.

There were 6,877 households, of which 34.6% had children under the age of 18 living with them, 40.6% were married couples living together, 15.4% had a female householder with no husband present, 6.1% had a male householder with no wife present, and 37.9% were non-families. 32.6% of all households were made up of individuals, and 13.9% had someone living alone who was 65 years of age or older. The average household size was 2.57 and the average family size was 3.26.

The median age in the city was 34.2 years. 27.8% of residents were under the age of 18; 9.5% were between the ages of 18 and 24; 26% were from 25 to 44; 22.8% were from 45 to 64; and 13.9% were 65 years of age or older. The gender makeup of the city was 49.3% male and 50.7% female.

2000 census
As of the census of 2000, there were 19,684 people, 7,604 households, and 4,737 families residing in the city. The racial makeup of the city was 89.79% White, 2.08% African American, 0.37% Native American, 0.90% Asian, 0.06% Pacific Islander, 5.63% from other races, and 1.18% from two or more races. Hispanic or Latino of any race were 12.58% of the population.

There were 7,604 households, out of which 30.2% had children under the age of 18 living with them, 44.8% were married couples living together, 12.4% had a female householder with no husband present, and 37.7% were non-families. 31.6% of all households were made up of individuals, and 14.8% had someone living alone who was 65 years of age or older. The average household size was 2.47 and the average family size was 3.06.

In the city, the population was spread out, with 25.7% under the age of 18, 10.3% from 18 to 24, 29.4% from 25 to 44, 19.4% from 45 to 64, and 15.2% who were 65 years of age or older. The median age was 34 years. For every 100 females, there were 100.7 males. For every 100 females age 18 and over, there were 95.2 males.

The median income for a household in the city was $33,483, and the median income for a family was $40,497. Males had a median income of $28,785 versus $21,660 for females. The per capita income for the city was $17,085. About 6.4% of families and 10.1% of the population were below the poverty line, including 14.4% of those under age 18 and 4.8% of those age 65 or over.

Employers
According to the website "Indiana's Technology Corridor" the largest employers in the Logansport/Cass County area are:

Transportation
Logansport is served by US 35, running northwest-southeast through the town. US 24's business route runs east-west through town. Indiana State Road 25 runs northeast-southwest through Logansport.

The town had been a crossroads of east-west trains of the Wabash Railroad between St. Louis and Detroit and Pennsylvania Railroad trains running northwest-southeast between Chicago and Cincinnati. Serving the town were a Wabash station, a main Pennsylvania RR station and an auxiliary PRR Logansport station called Van Station. The last train on the Wabash line was the Wabash Cannon Ball in 1971. The Penn Central ran the last Chicago-Cincinnati train through Logansport, an unnamed successor to the Buckeye night train, in 1969. The Penn Central South Wind pooled with other companies ran south to Florida up to 1971. A day train counterpart to the Buckeye lingered on at least another year.

The nearest airport to Logansport with commercial service is Fort Wayne International Airport (FWA).

Notable people
 Phyllis A. Balch, nutritionist and writer
 Dai Buell, pianist, raised in Logansport
 Samuel P. Bush, patriarch of the Bush political family, worked here as a railroad mechanic
 John B. Chase, Wisconsin state senator
 Ann Christy, actress
 Gary Colson, college basketball coach
 Red Corriden, MLB infielder, 1950 manager of Chicago White Sox
 George Cuppy, baseball pitcher
 Michael Fansler, Justice of the Indiana Supreme Court
 Graham N. Fitch, Indiana pioneer senator; Union Army officer during the Civil War; half-brother of LeRoy
 LeRoy Fitch, United States Naval officer during the Civil War; half-brother of Graham
 Helen Thornton Geer, author; Professor of Library Science; granddaughter of Henry Clay Thornton
 Isaac Wheeler Geer, prominent railroad executive; father of Helen T. Geer
 Edna Goodrich, Broadway and silent screen star; married to comedian Nat Goodwin; member of Thornton family
 Arthur Martin Graffis, interim president, Elcar Automotive; member, Thornton family
 Herb Graffis, writer, member of World Golf Hall of Fame
 Charles Vernon Gridley, US Navy officer during the American Civil War and the Spanish–American War
 Aaron Heilman, professional baseball pitcher.
 Tony Hinkle, Basketball Hall of Fame player and coach, inventor of orange basketball; Hinkle Fieldhouse named for him
 Clara Ingram Judson, children's author
 Maibelle Heikes Justice, American novelist and screenwriter
 Greg Kinnear, Oscar-nominated actor
 Moses Lairy, Justice of the Indiana Supreme Court
 Kenesaw Mountain Landis, brother of Charles B. Landis and Frederick Landis, a federal judge and first Commissioner of Baseball, grew up in Logansport, where at 17 he played on and managed the Logansport High School baseball team
 Charles B. Landis, brother of Kenesaw Mountain Landis and Frederick Landis, editor of Logansport Journal (1883-1887), U.S. Representative from Indiana (1897-1909)
 Frederick Landis, brother of Kenesaw Mountain Landis and Charles B. Landis, U.S. Representative from Indiana (1903-1907), organizer of the Progressive Party (United States, 1912).
 David Myers, Justice of the Indiana Supreme Court
 Edwin Rutenber, inventor of the first 4-cylinder automobile engine
 Sir Henry Worth Thornton, President, Canadian National Railways; Vanderbilt football coach
James Johnston Thornton, federal judge during Reconstruction
 William Patton Thornton, Ohio physician, politician
 William Wheeler Thornton, Deputy Attorney General, State Supreme Court Librarian, author
 John Tipton, United States Senator (1832–1839)
 Tutt Brothers, African American acting/performing duo
 James Calvin Wilsey, guitarist
 George Winter, pioneer artist

References

External links
 City of Logansport, Indiana website
 Logan's Landing downtown economic-development and cultural-renewal organization
 Logansport – Cass County Chamber of Commerce

 
Cities in Cass County, Indiana
Cities in Indiana
Micropolitan areas of Indiana
County seats in Indiana
Populated places established in 1826
1826 establishments in Indiana